Raycho Khristov (born 4 October 1945) is a retired Bulgarian gymnast. He competed at the  1968 Summer Olympics in all artistic gymnastics events and finished 11th with the Bulgarian team. His best individual achievement was ninth place on the floor.

References

1945 births
Living people
Gymnasts at the 1968 Summer Olympics
Bulgarian male artistic gymnasts
Olympic gymnasts of Bulgaria
People from Haskovo
Sportspeople from Haskovo Province